The 2023 Legends League Cricket Masters or LLC Masters (also known as Skyexch.net Legends League Cricket Masters for sponsorship reasons) was a T20 cricket tournament featuring recently retired players, many of them former internationals. It is an international edition and third edition  of Legends League Cricket,  featuring three teams - India Maharajas, Asia Lions, and World Giants. Qatar Cricket Association hosted the tournament in West End Park International Cricket Stadium, Doha, Qatar from 10 March 2023 to 20 March 2023.

The league is organized by Absolute Legends Sports Pvt. Ltd.

For the third edition of the league, legendary cricketers Gautam Gambhir (India Maharajas), Shahid Afridi (Asia Lions), and Aaron Finch (World Giants) were chosen to be the captains of their respective teams. The league featured many cricketing legends like Harbhajan Singh, Brett Lee, Shoaib Akhtar, Aaron Finch, Gautam Gambhir, Irfan Pathan, Tillakaratne Dilshan, Chris Gayle, Shahid Afridi, S. Sreesanth amongst others, playing against each other to reignite famous cricketing rivalries of the recent past.

Squads 
Source: ESPN Cricinfo

Venue 
Third edition of the league will be hosted under the aegis of Qatar Cricket Association at West End Park International Cricket Stadium.

New Rules

Impact Player 

 Along with the starting XI, teams would name four substitutes in their team sheet at the toss, and use one of the four during the match.
 The player can replace any member of the starting XI at any point before the end of the 14th over of either innings, and would be able to bat and bowl his full allotment of overs.
 The tactical scope of the Impact Player rule is vast, with no real restriction on the role he can play. For example, the Impact Player can replace a batter who has already been dismissed, and still get to bat - as long as the team only uses 11 batters or he could replace a bowler who has already sent down a few overs and still get to bowl his full four-over quota.

Points Table 

(C) Champions
 Advanced to the final
 Advanced to the eliminator

League stage 

The schedule was published on the official website on 27 February 2023.

All times are according to Arabian Standard Time (UTC+03:00).

Knockout Stage

Eliminator

Final

Broadcasters 
Star Sports, Disney+ Hotstar and FanCode are the official broadcasters of this league in India.

References

External links 
 Series home at Cricbuzz
 Series home at ESPN Cricinfo

Cricket in Qatar
Twenty20 cricket leagues
Qatar in international cricket